The Book of Etiquette and Ceremonial is a Chinese classic text about Zhou dynasty social behavior and ceremonial ritual as it was practiced and understood during the Spring and Autumn period. The Book of Etiquette and Ceremonial, along with the Rites of Zhou and the Book of Rites, formed the "Three Rites" which guided traditional Confucian understandings of propriety and behavior.

Title
The modern Chinese title Yili is a compound of two words with many related meanings, leading to a variety of English translations including the Book of Etiquette and Ceremonial, Etiquette and Rites (Theobald, 2010), the Ceremonies and Rites, Ceremonial and Rites, etc. Yi  may mean "right", "proper", "ceremony" (Baxter & Sagart 2011:80) "demeanor", "appearance", "etiquette", "rite", "present", "gift", or "equipment". Li , meanwhile, may mean "propriety", "ceremony" (Baxter & Sagart 2011:110) "rite", "ritual", "courtesy", "etiquette", "manners", or "mores".

According to some scholars (e.g. German Sinologist Alfred Forke), the text was first called the Yili in Wang Chong's treatise Lunheng (c. 80 CE); however, Xing Wen contends that "" in the original Chinese text refers the ceremonies and rites themselves, not the book. Prior to that, it was called the Rites of the Shi (Shili), the Classic of Rites (Lijing), the Old Classic of Rites (Ligujing), or simply the Rites (Li).  refers to this book, as  Yílǐ, among works annotated by scholar .

History
Traditional Chinese scholarship credited the text (along with the Rites of Zhou) to the 11th century BCE Duke of Zhou. Sinologist William Boltz (1993:237) says this tradition is "now generally recognized as untenable", but believes the extant Yili "is a remnant of "a larger corpus of similar ceremonial and ritual texts dating from pre-Han times, perhaps as early as the time of Confucius; that much of this was lost by Han", while "some may have come to be preserved in the text known today as the [Liji]". Nylan (2001:191) suggests that multiple strata in the text with slight differences in grammar indicate that the text was compiled over an extended period.

Many Chinese texts were irretrievably lost during Qin Shihuang's "Burning of the Books". The Book of Etiquette and Ceremonial survived in two versions: the "Old Text" supposedly discovered in the walls of Confucius's former residence, and the "New Text". The 2nd century scholar Zheng Xuan compiled an edition from both texts and wrote the first commentary. The 3rd century Wang Su wrote two commentaries and criticized Zheng, but Zheng's version became the basis for later editions and scholarship (Boltz 1993:240). It was among the works carved into the 837 CE Kaicheng Stone Classics and was first printed from woodblocks between 932 and 953 CE (Boltz 1993:240). Three fragmentary manuscripts covering more than seven chapters were discovered in 1st-century Han tombs at Wuwei in Gansu in 1959.

The first Western editions of the Book of Etiquette and Ceremonial were translations into French by Charles-Joseph de Harlez de Deulin in 1890 and Séraphin Couvreur in 1916. John Steele first translated the full text into English in 1917.

Content
After disparaging the repetitive and "unnecessary detail" in the text, John Steele described it as a "picture of the public and private life, education, family interests, and work-a-day religion of an average man in the China of 3,000 years ago" (Steele 1917:vii-viii). It contains one of the earliest references to the Three Obediences and Four Virtues, a set of principles directed exclusively at women that formed a core part of female education during the Zhou.

The received text of the Yili contains seventeen pian 篇 "chapters; sections".

Compared with the other ritual texts, the Etiquette and Ceremonial contains some highly detailed descriptions. Take for instance, this passage about the ceremony for the personator of the dead:

Then the host descends and washes a goblet. The personator and the aide descend also, and the host, laying the cup in the basket, declines the honor. To this the personator makes a suitable reply. When the washing is finished, they salute one another, and the personator goes up, but not the aide. Then the host fills the goblet and pledges the personator. Standing, facing north to the east of the eastern pillar, he sits down, laying down the cup, bows, the personator, to the west of the western pillar, facing north, and bowing in return. Then the host sits, offers of the wine, and drinks. When he has finished off the cup, he bows, the personator bowing in return. He then descends and washes the goblet, the personator descending and declining the honor. The host lays the cup in the basket, and making a suitable reply, finishes the washing and goes up, the personator going up also. Then the host fills the goblet, the personator bowing and receiving it. The host returns to his place and bows in reply. Then the personator faces north, sits, and lays the goblet to the left of the relishes, the personator, aide, and host all going to their mats. (tr. Steele 1917 2:195-6)

References

Notes

Works cited
Boltz, William G. "I-li" in Early Chinese Texts. A Bibliographical Guide, pp. 234–244. Society for the Study of Early China, 1993.
Couvreur, Séraphin. I-li, Cérémonial. Imprimerie de la Mission Catholique, 1916.

 
Steele, John C. The I-li: or Book of Etiquette and Ceremonial. Probsthain, 1917.
Theobald, Ulrich. "Yili 儀禮 'Etiquette and Ceremonials'". China Knowledge, 2010.

External links

Encyclopædia Britannica. "Yili".
The Yili at the Chinese Text Project
 The Book of Etiquette and Ceremonial 《儀禮》 at Chinese Notes with matching English vocabulary

Chinese classic texts
Confucian texts
Cultural conventions
Zhou dynasty texts
Confucian rites
Thirteen Classics